Tristan Charpentier (born 12 August 2000) is a French race car driver from Béthune.

Racing record

Career summary

Complete French F4 Championship results 
(key) (Races in bold indicate pole position) (Races in italics indicate fastest lap)

Complete Super Formula results
(key) (Races in bold indicate pole position) (Races in italics indicate fastest lap)

American open–wheel racing results

Indy Pro 2000 Championship

References

External links
 

2000 births
Living people
French racing drivers
French F4 Championship drivers
SMP F4 Championship drivers
BRDC British Formula 3 Championship drivers
Super Formula drivers
Ginetta Junior Championship drivers
MP Motorsport drivers
People from Béthune
Chris Dittmann Racing drivers
Indy Pro 2000 Championship drivers
Sportspeople from Pas-de-Calais
Fortec Motorsport drivers